Arnie McWatters was a Canadian quarterback and halfback in the Ontario Rugby Football Union.

Coming straight from high school, McWatters played for his hometown Sarnia Imperials from 1935 to 1938, with his finest season being 1936, when he won the Grey Cup and was an all-star. He next played four seasons with the Ottawa Rough Riders where he won another Grey Cup in 1940 and was an all-star in 1942. After one season with the Ottawa Combines, he finished his career playing four seasons for the Ottawa Trojans, the highlight coming in 1945 when he won the Imperial Oil Trophy as OFRU most valuable player.

He later coached the University of Ottawa and Carleton University football teams. In 1991 he was elected to the Sarnia Lambton Sports Hall of Fame.

References

Sportspeople from Sarnia
Ontario Rugby Football Union players
Ottawa Rough Riders players
Sarnia Imperials players
Players of Canadian football from Ontario